The Brazilian worm lizard (Amphisbaena brasiliana) is a worm lizard species in the family Amphisbaenidae. It is endemic to Brazil.

References

Amphisbaena (lizard)
Reptiles described in 1865
Taxa named by John Edward Gray
Endemic fauna of Brazil
Reptiles of Brazil